Kaltan is a town in Kemerovo Oblast, Russia, located on the Kondoma River,  south of Kemerovo, the administrative center of the oblast. Population:

History

It was founded in 1946 and was granted urban-type settlement status in 1950 and town status in 1959.

Administrative and municipal status
Within the framework of administrative divisions, it is, together with four rural localities, incorporated as Kaltan Town Under Oblast Jurisdiction—an administrative unit with the status equal to that of the districts. As a municipal division, Kaltan Town Under Oblast Jurisdiction is incorporated as Kaltansky Urban Okrug.

References

Notes

Sources

External links

Official website of Kaltan 
Kaltan Business Directory 

Cities and towns in Kemerovo Oblast